Navarro, or Navarro-by-the-Sea, a historic site in Mendocino County, California, on Navarro Beach Rd. near Albion, California, was listed on the National Register of Historic Places in 2009.

It is located on Navarro Beach Road (possibly also called Navarro Bluff Road) near the mouth of the Navarro River.

The listing was the result of a nonprofit group's effort to preserve and restore two historic buildings.  The project made some head-way, including getting the National Register listing, but failed in other respects.  In 2019, there are renewed efforts, including a June 2019 event.

Navarro-by-the-Sea Center (NSCR), a 501(c)(3) nonprofit seeks to "save the two remaining historic structures of the original town of Navarro at the mouth of the Navarro River, and reopen them for public education, interpretation, and research."

References

National Register of Historic Places in Mendocino County, California
Georgian architecture in the United States